Plotiopsis balonnensis is a species of freshwater snail, a gastropod mollusk in the family Thiaridae.

Ecology
Parasites of Plotiopsis balonnensis include trematode Sychnocotyle kholo.

References

External links

Thiaridae
Gastropods described in 1850
Freshwater molluscs of Oceania